Percy Jackson is the title character and narrator of Rick Riordan's Percy Jackson & the Olympians series.

Percy Jackson (disambiguation) may refer to:

 Percy Jackson (film series), an American feature film series based on the novel series 
 Percy Jackson (ice hockey) (1906–1972), ice hockey player
 Percy Jackson (footballer, born 1907) (1907–1970), Australian rules footballer
 Percy Jackson (footballer, born 1894) (1894–1959), Australian rules footballer

See also
 Percy Jackson & the Olympians: The Lightning Thief, a 2010 fantasy film

Jackson, Percy